Henry, Duke of Parma and Piacenza (Italian: Enrico Maria Alberto Ferdinando Carlo Pio Luigi Antonio di Borbone-Parma e Piacenza; 13 June 1873 – 16 November 1939) was the head of the House of Bourbon-Parma and the pretender to the defunct throne of Parma from 1907 to 1939.

Life
Prince Enrico was born at Wartegg Castle in Rorschach, the second but eldest surviving son of Robert I, Duke of Parma and his first wife, Princess Maria Pia of Bourbon-Two Sicilies. He had an intellectual disability and from 1907 (his father's death), his brother Elias took up the role as head of the family and served as regent throughout his and his brother Joseph's titular reigns. However, Enrico continued to be considered by legitimists as Henry of Parma.

Enrico died in 1939 at Pianore, near Lucca, Italy, unmarried and without issue. He was succeeded as titular pretender of Parma by his brother Joseph.

Ancestry

See also
Duchy of Parma
House of Bourbon-Parma

 

  

Pretenders to the throne of Parma
Princes of Bourbon-Parma
Princes of Parma and Piacenza
Henry I
Knights of the Golden Fleece
Henry I of Parma
Henry I of Parma
Sons of monarchs